Ludger Desmarais was a Canadian professional ice hockey defenceman. He was born in Sudbury, Ontario, Canada.

Playing career 

Bourcier played for the Pittsburgh Shamrocks of the International Hockey League. He also spent much of his playing time in the Canadian-American Hockey League with the Springfield Indians, Boston Tigers, Providence Reds and the Philadelphia Arrows. He finished his career playing in the American Hockey Association with the Wichita Skyhawks and the Kansas City Greyhounds. He finished his career with Wichita in 1939.

External links 
 Ludger Desmarais Career Stats

Providence Reds players
Philadelphia Arrows players
Springfield Indians players
Boston Tigers (CAHL) players
Pittsburgh Shamrocks players
Franco-Ontarian people
Ice hockey people from Ontario
Sportspeople from Greater Sudbury
Canadian ice hockey defencemen